Sergei Sergeyevich Faustov (born 7 February 1983) is a former Russian professional footballer.

Club career
He made his debut for FC Rostov on 14 September 2002 in a Russian Cup game against FC Kristall Smolensk.

He played two seasons in the Russian Football National League for FC Fakel Voronezh.

Honours
 Russian Cup finalist: 2003 (played for the main FC Rostov squad in the competition).
 Russian Second Division Zone Center top scorer: 2006 (16 goals).

References

External links
 

1983 births
People from Stary Oskol
Living people
Russian footballers
Association football forwards
FC Olimpia Volgograd players
FC Rostov players
FC Fakel Voronezh players
FC Ural Yekaterinburg players
FC Rotor Volgograd players
FC Sokol Saratov players
FC Olimp-Dolgoprudny players
Sportspeople from Belgorod Oblast